Tlyarata is a rural locality (a selo) in Russia. It is the administrative center of Tlyaratinsky District, Republic of Dagestan, Russia. It is located in the west of the republic of Dagestan in a mountainous area near the Azerbaijan and Georgia.

Population: 

It is the home of World champion boxer Sultan Ibragimov.

References

Rural localities in Tlyaratinsky District